Elix  may refer to:
 Əlix, a village in the municipality of Quturğan in the Qusar Rayon of Azerbaijan
 John Alan Elix (born 1941) (Elix), an Australian lichenologist

See also
 Helix (disambiguation)